Cathy Anne Sandeen (born December 18, 1955 in Oakland California) is an American academic administrator who began her appointment as University President at California State University, East Bay (Hayward, CA) in January, 2021.

Early life and education 
Sandeen was born in Oakland and raised in San Leandro, California. Sandeen earned a bachelor's degree in speech-language pathology from Humboldt State University and a master's degree in broadcast communication from San Francisco State University. She then earned a Master of Business Administration from the UCLA Anderson School of Management and a Ph.D in communication from the University of Utah.

Career 
Prior to joining the University of Alaska, Sandeen served as the chancellor of the University of Wisconsin Colleges and University of Wisconsin–Extension. Sandeen previously served as dean of Continuing Education at UCLA Extension from 2006 to 2012, and vice provost and dean of the University Extension and summer session at University of California, Santa Cruz from 2000 to 2006. On October 29, 2020 the California State University Board of Trustees announced Dr. Sandeen's appointment as President of California State University East Bay, with her term beginning January 4, 2021.

References 

American academic administrators
California State Polytechnic University, Humboldt alumni
Heads of universities and colleges in the United States
Living people
People from Anchorage, Alaska
San Francisco State University alumni
UCLA Anderson School of Management alumni
University of Utah alumni
Women academic administrators
1955 births